The 16th Infantry Division of the German Army was formed in 1934. On 26 August 1939 the division was mobilized for the invasion of Poland (1939). It participated in the Battle of France in August 1940. The division was then split, resulting in two independent units: The 16th Panzer Division and the 16th Motorized Infantry Division. Then later, from 1944 onward, combined with other non 16th elements, was known as the 116th Panzer Division.

16th Panzer Division

The 16th Panzer Division served as a reserve in Romania during the Balkans campaign in 1941. It then participated in Operation Barbarossa with Army Group South, also in 1941.

A kampfgruppe of 16th Panzer Division, led by Count Strachwitz, reached the outskirts of Stalingrad on 23 August 1942, brushing aside the sole Soviet defences, anti-aircraft guns manned by female factory workers (possibly the 1077th Anti-Aircraft Regiment). The 16th Panzer Division was encircled and ultimately destroyed at Stalingrad during the winter of 1942–43.

It was rebuilt for a campaign in the west, fought in Sicily and southern Italy during the Italian Campaign in 1943 and returned to the Russian Front later in the year. Severely mauled near Kiev, it was withdrawn to Poland for rehabilitation in 1944. The 16th Panzer Division returned to the east in 1945, where it surrendered to the Soviets and Americans in Czechoslovakia.

Motorized Division
The 16th Motorized Infantry Division, nicknamed Windhund ("Greyhound"), participated in the Balkans campaign in 1941 along with the 16th Panzer Division (see above). It took part in Operation Barbarossa with Army Group South later in the year. It advanced on the Caucasus with elements coming to within 20 miles of Astrakhan in 1942 – the most easterly point reached by any German unit during the war.

It also participated in the Battle of Stalingrad. The 16th Motorized Infantry Division participated in defensive operations after the Soviets broke up the front of the southern sector.

In June 1943, it was upgraded to 16th Panzergrenadier Division. This upgraded formation was depleted in the continuous retreats and was transferred to France for rest and refitting.

116th Panzer Division

In March 1944, it was reorganized as the 116th Panzer Division (with the number changed since the 16th Panzer Division was already taken by its sibling), absorbing the 179th Reserve Panzer Division in the process. This new formation fought in the Battle of Normandy and was almost destroyed in the Falaise Gap.

It subsequently defended the Siegfried Line at Aachen in an understrength condition. The 116th Panzer Division was withdrawn for refitting and then recommitted, but was unable to hold the city of Aachen. It later participated in the Battle of Hurtgen Forest then in the Battle of the Bulge, again sustaining heavy casualties. It was caught in the Wesel Pocket, but got across the Rhine, ultimately surrendering within the Ruhr Pocket in April, 1945.

16th Volksgrenadier Division

In parallel, a 16th Volksgrenadier Division was created in October 1944, which defended the Upper Rhine until March 1945, when it was forced to retreat deeper into Germany.

War crimes
The 16th Motorized Infantry Division has been implicated in the San Clemente di Caserta massacre, Campania, on 4 October 1943, when 25 civilians were murdered.

Organization 
Structure of the division:
 Headquarters
 16th Reconnaissance Battalion
 60th Infantry Regiment
 64th Infantry Regiment
 79th Infantry Regiment
 16th Field Replacement Battalion
 16th Engineer Battalion
 16th Artillery Regiment
 16th Anti-Tank Battalion
 16th Signal Battalion
 16th Divisional Supply Group

Commanding officers

16th Infantry Division 
 Generalleutnant Gerhard Glokke (October 1934 – 12 October 1937)
 Generalleutnant Gotthard Heinrici (12 October 1937 – 31 January 1940)
 Generalmajor Heinrich Krampf (1 February 1940 – 31 May 1940)
 Generalmajor Hans-Valentin Hube (1 June 1940 – 6 August 1940)

16th Motorized Infantry Division 
 Generalleutnant Friedrich-Wilhelm von Chappuis (12 August 1940 – 15 March 1941)
 Generalleutnant Sigfrid Henrici (15 March 1941 – Mid August 1941)
 Generalleutnant Johannes Streich (Mid August 1941 – Mid November 1941)
 Generalleutnant Sigfrid Henrici (Mid November 1941 – 13 November 1942)
 Generalmajor Gerhard Graf von Schwerin (13 November 1942 – 20 May 1943)
 Oberst Wilhelm Crisolli (20 May 1943 – 27 June 1943)

16th Panzergrenadier Division 
 General der Panzertruppen Gerhard Graf von Schwerin (27 June 1943 – January 1944)
 Generalmajor Günther von Manteuffel (January 1944 – March 1944)
 Generalmajor Karl Stingl (March 1944)

References

Bibliography

 
 

0*016
Military units and formations established in 1934
1934 establishments in Germany
1*16
Military units and formations disestablished in 1945
Military units and formations of Germany in Yugoslavia in World War II